Fourth-seeded Maria Bueno defeated first-seeded Margaret Smith 7–5, 6–4 in the final to win the women's singles tennis title at the 1963 U.S. National Championships.

Seeds
The seeded players are listed below. Maria Bueno is the champion; others show in brackets the round in which they were eliminated.

  Margaret Smith (finalist)
  Darlene Hard (quarterfinals)
  Billie Jean Moffitt (fourth round)
  Maria Bueno (champion)
  Nancy Richey (quarterfinals)
  Ann Haydon-Jones (semifinals)
  Christine Truman (quarterfinals)
  Robyn Ebbern (third round)
  Věra Suková (fourth round)
  Carole Caldwell (fourth round)
  Norma Baylon (fourth round)
  Margaret Hunt (fourth round)

Draw

Key
 Q = Qualifier
 WC = Wild card
 LL = Lucky loser
 r = Retired

Final eight

References

1963
1963 in women's tennis
1963 in American women's sports
Wom